"Rage, Tyrants" (Ukrainian: "Шалійте") is a Ukrainian socialist revolutionary song, written by Oleksandr Kolessa in 1889 during student protests in Lviv (then part of Austria-Hungary). It is sung to the melody of "Khor Normannov" from Anatole Vakhnianyn's opera Yaropolk.

It was translated to Polish by Kazimierz Pietkiewicz in 1895 as "Pieśń wolnego ducha" and in 1898 from Polish to Russian by Gleb Krzhizhanovsky (who was imprisoned in the Butyrka prison together with Pietkiewicz) as "Беснуйтесь, тираны". It became a popular song among Ukrainian, Polish and Russian socialists and communists during the early 20th century (especially during the 1905 Revolution), and was also translated into other languages, such as German ("Wütet nur Henker") and Esperanto ("Koleru, tiranoj").

During the Soviet Union era, some Ukrainians opposing the Soviet government also sang the song, interpreting the "tyrants" as Russian communists.

"Rage, Tyrants" is quoted in the Symphony No. 11 in G minor by Dmitri Shostakovich, alongside the Polish song "Warszawianka".

Lyrics

Ukrainian version

Translations

References

Protest songs
Ukrainian songs
Socialism in Ukraine